is a Japanese Brazilian fashion model and tarento who has appeared in a number of television programmes and magazine issues.

Filmography

Runways
For convenience, the runway is assumed to be Spring/Summer as S/S and Autumn/Winter as A/W.
Tokyo Girls Collection: 2012 A/W, 2013 S/S
in Nagoya (2012)

Variety
Sunday Japon (Oct 2012 – , TBS) Quasi-regular
Night Which is Noisy Together with Uchimura (Apr 2013 – Sep 2014, TBS) Regular
The House (MXTV) - Studio MC
first season (Oct–Dec 2015)
second season (Jan–Mar 2016)

TV dramas
Hanasaku ashita Episode 1 (5 Jan 2014, NHK BS Premium) as Sara
Ubai Ai, Fuyu (Jan–Mar 2017, EX) as Reika Onoe

Internet dramas
Mōchoi, Ubai Ai with Sei Drama (Jan 2017 – , AbemaTV) as Reika Onoe

Image model
Avail
Canmake

Bibliography

Photo albums
I'll give you my all (15 Jun 2015, Takarajimasha) 
Enjo (25 Jan 2016, Shueisha, Photographer: Naoki Rakuman) 
My Baby (23 Nov 2016, Kadokawa)*Person in charge of photographing other than cover

Magazine serialisations
JJ (No. Jul 2012 – Oct 2015, Kobunsha)

Newspaper series
Zubatto G-ron (Feb 2013 – , Sports Hochi)

Awards
16th Best Swimmer Award.
Nail Queen 2015 Model Department (2015)

References

External links
 
 – Ameba Blog 

Brazilian female models
Japanese female models
Japanese gravure models
Expatriate television personalities in Japan
Brazilian people of Italian descent
Brazilian people of Japanese descent
Brazilian expatriates in Japan
People from São Paulo
1990 births
Living people